Aleksandr Yevgenyevich Nechayev (born 17 July 1989) is a former Russian professional football player.

Club career
He played two seasons in the Moldovan National Division for FC Dacia Chişinău.

External links
 
 Career summary by sportbox.ru
 

1989 births
Sportspeople from Saratov
Living people
Russian footballers
Association football forwards
FC Saturn Ramenskoye players
FC Sokol Saratov players
Jakobstads BK players
FC Dacia Chișinău players
Kakkonen players
Moldovan Super Liga players
Russian expatriate footballers
Expatriate footballers in Finland
Expatriate footballers in Moldova